Tiruppur is a Lok Sabha constituency in Tamil Nadu. Its Tamil Nadu Parliamentary Constituency number is 18 of 39. Originally, Gobichettipalayam, it was converted to Tiruppur by Election commission after rearrangement of constituencies in 2008.

Assembly segments
Tiruppur Lok Sabha constituency is composed of the following assembly segments.

Members of the Parliament

Before 2008
1957-62 K. S. Ramaswamy	(Indian National Congress)
1962-67	P. G. Karuthiruman	(Indian National Congress)
1967-71	P.A. Saminathan Muthaliyar	(Dravida Munnetra Kazhagam)
1971-77 P.A. Saminathan Muthaliyar	(Dravida Munnetra Kazhagam)
1977-80 K. S. Ramaswamy	(Indian National Congress)
1980-84 C. Chinnaswamy	(All India Anna Dravida Munnetra Kazhagam)
1984-89	P. Kolandaivelu	(All India Anna Dravida Munnetra Kazhagam)
1989-91	P. G. Narayanan	(All India Anna Dravida Munnetra Kazhagam)
1991-96	P. G. Narayanan	(All India Anna Dravida Munnetra Kazhagam)
1996-98	V. P Shanmugasundaram	(Dravida Munnetra Kazhagam)
1998-99	V. K. Chinnasamy	(All India Anna Dravida Munnetra Kazhagam)
1999-04	K. K. Kaliappan	(All India Anna Dravida Munnetra Kazhagam)
2004-09	E. V. K. S. Elangovan	(Indian National Congress)

Detailed election results

General Election 2019

General Election 2014

General Election 2009

References

External links
Tiruppur lok sabha  constituency election 2019 date and schedule

Lok Sabha constituencies in Tamil Nadu
Tiruppur district